This is a list of craters on Europa. The surface of Jupiter's moon Europa is very young, geologically speaking, and as a result there are very few craters. Furthermore, as Europa's surface is potentially made of weak water ice over a liquid ocean, most surviving craters have slumped so that their structure is very low in relief. Most of the craters that are large enough to have names are named after prominent figures in Celtic myths and folklore.

List 

back to top

External links
 USGS: Europa nomenclature
 USGS: Europa Nomenclature: Craters

Europa
Europa
Europa